Darwol Station is a railroad station on the Suin Line of the Seoul Metropolitan Subway in Siheung, Gyeonggi Province, South Korea. It opened on 27 December 2014.

Metro stations in Siheung
Railway stations opened in 2014
Seoul Metropolitan Subway stations
2014 establishments in South Korea